Catherine Strangeways may refer to:

 Lady Katherine Neville, married name Catherine Strangeways
Lady Catherine Gordon, married name Catherine Strangeways